The Sunday Mirror was an English language weekly newspaper in Ceylon published by Times of Ceylon Limited (TOCL). It was founded in 1966 and was published from Colombo. In 1966 it had an average net sales of 20,629.

TOCL was nationalised by the Sri Lankan government in August 1977. The state-run TOCL faced financial and labour problems and on 31 January 1985 it and its various publications closed down.

References

1966 establishments in Ceylon
Defunct English-language newspapers published in Sri Lanka
Defunct Sunday newspapers published in Sri Lanka
Publications established in 1966
Times of Ceylon Limited